Maureen Jones (born 6 June 1927) is an Australian classical pianist.

She was born in Sydney and grew up in the Sydney suburbs of Warrawee, Turramurra, and Gladesville. At primary-school age she was invited to study at the Sydney Conservatorium of Music by its director Edgar Bainton, and made her debut with the Sydney Symphony Orchestra at age ten playing Beethoven's first piano concerto. She performed with Musica Viva from 1948 to 1950, before emigrating to Europe. She briefly lived in London and then went to Zürich, where she formed a duo with Australian violinist Brenton Langbein which became a trio with him and Australian horn player Barry Tuckwell. She later married the cellist of the trio, Amadeo Baldovino.

She performed with the London Symphony Orchestra, the Royal Philharmonic Orchestra, the Tonhalle Orchester Zürich, and the Berlin Philharmonic, for the Edinburgh International Festival, the BBC and the RAI; and for the Academy of St. Cecilia and at La Fenice in Venice. In 1979 she co-founded Quintetto Fauré with violinist Pina Carmirelli. She lived in Rome for ten years until moving to Florence to teach at the Fiesole School of Music, living with Baldovino until his death in 1998. She stayed in Florence for eighteen years before moving to Lugano in Switzerland. In 2017, she performed a concert in Trieste for her 90th birthday with pianist Massimiliano Baggio; they played Brahms's two-piano arrangement of his Piano Quartet No. 2 in A, Op. 26. She was made a Knight of the Order of Merit of the Italian Republic.

References

Australian classical pianists
Australian women pianists
Sydney Conservatorium of Music alumni
Australian expatriates in England
Australian expatriates in Italy
Australian expatriates in Switzerland
Musicians from Sydney
20th-century classical pianists
20th-century Australian musicians
20th-century Australian women
Knights of the Order of Merit of the Italian Republic
1927 births
Living people
20th-century women pianists